

Alfred A. Robles (February 16, 1930 - May 2, 2009) was a Filipino American poet and community activist in San Francisco. Born in 1930, he was the second eldest in a family of ten brothers and sisters and grew up in the Fillmore district of San Francisco. A community character, he was instrumental in the political fight against the city to stop the demolition of the International Hotel on Kearny Street. He was also a prominent member of the San Francisco-based Asian American writers' collective Kearny Street Workshop.

Al Robles combined heritage with experience. His poetry and community work honored Filipino elders (Manongs) and also inspired and encouraged the young students, activists, writers and artists to connect to their Filipino heritage. Verses about traditional Filipino foods, his experiences in Hawaii, New Mexico, and community personalities in San Francisco resulted in countless poems, and two published works: "Looking for Ifugao Mountain: Paghahanap Sa Bundok Ng Ifugao and Rappin' with Ten Thousand Carabaos in the Dark.

In 2008, filmmaker Curtis Choy released a documentary about Al Robles called Manilatown is in the Heart: Time Travel with Al Robles, focusing on Robles' many personalities and community roles. It has been shown at countless film festivals, including the 2009 DisOrient Film Festival, in Eugene, OR, Asian Pacific Heritage Month 2009 in Los Altos Hills, and the 2009 Los Angeles Asian Pacific Film Festival, where it was a Finalist for the Grand Jury Award for Best Documentary.

Works

Poetry
Ifugao Mountain: Paghahanap Sa Bundok Ng Ifugao (1977)
Rappin' with Ten Thousand Carabaos in the Dark (1992)

Film
Manilatown is in the Heart: Time Travel with Al Robles (2008)

References

External links
Family Memorial Site
Manilatown: Inspirations of Al Robles
Documentary: Manilatown in the Heart, Time Travel with Al Robles 
Rappin with Ten Thousand Carabaos in the Dark

American poets of Asian descent
American writers of Filipino descent
Writers from San Francisco
1930 births
2009 deaths
20th-century American poets